Barra Futebol Clube, commonly known as Barra de Teresópolis or simply as Barra, was a Brazilian football club based in Teresópolis, Rio de Janeiro state. They competed in the Série C once.

History
The club was founded on June 8, 1939. They professionalized its football department in 1993, competing in the Campeonato Carioca Third Level. Barra competed in the Série C in 1995, when they were eliminated in the Third Stage by XV de Piracicaba. The club closed its professional football department in 1996.

Stadium
Barra Futebol Clube played their home games at Estádio Jorge Ferreira da Silva, nicknamed Pitucão. The stadium has a maximum capacity of 4,000 people.

References

Association football clubs established in 1939
Association football clubs disestablished in 1996
Defunct football clubs in Rio de Janeiro (state)
Teresópolis
1939 establishments in Brazil
1996 disestablishments in Brazil